Luis Sergio Peris-Mencheta Barrio (born 7 April 1975), better known as Sergio Peris-Mencheta, is a Spanish theatre, cinema, and television actor, as well as a theatre director.

Life and career
Luis Sergio Peris-Mencheta Barrio was born on 7 April 1975 in Madrid, son to a Spanish father and a Moscow-born mother, daughter of Spanish exiles. A rugby player for the team of the Lycée Français, he also was part of international teams that won several championships, and was captain of his youth team. After finishing secondary school, he enrolled at the Charles III University of Madrid, but while participating in the university theater group  directed by Inés París he discovered a desire to become an actor. 

In 1998, Peris-Mencheta landed a role in teen drama television series Al salir de clase, which earned him popularity. He played Dani Daroca, one of the students of the Siete Robles school.

He made his feature film debut in Jara (1999), in which he starred alongside the also debuting Olivia Molina and seasoned actress Ángela Molina. He portrayed Tato, a man who finds a mysterious and beautiful woman (Jara) living alone in the forest since she was a child, starting a murky relationship.

In 2017, he married actress , whom with he has had 2 children in common.

Filmography

References

External links 

1975 births
Living people
Spanish male film actors
20th-century Spanish male actors
21st-century Spanish male actors
Spanish male television actors